Frederick William Evans (9 June 1808 – 6 March 1893) was a Shaker writer who served as an elder in the Mount Lebanon Shaker Society for many years. Evans was the younger brother of the land reformer George Henry Evans.

Biography
Evans was born in Leominster, England. His father settled in the United States in 1820, and apprenticed him to a hatter in New York. A diligent student in his leisure hours, Evans was attracted by the theories of Robert Dale Owen and Charles Fourier. After a brief return to Britain, he joined the Shaker community. He became the Presiding Elder in 1858. He died in New Lebanon, New York.

Evans was a vegetarian for sixty years.

Works
 Tests of Divine Revelation (1853)
 Compendium (1859)
 Ann Lee (The Founder of the Shakers): A Biography (1869)
 Shaker Communism (1871)
 Autobiography of a Shaker (1888)

References

Further reading
 

1808 births
1893 deaths
19th-century American non-fiction writers
English emigrants to the United States
English Shaker missionaries
New York (state) socialists
People from Leominster
People from New Lebanon, New York
Writers from New York City